The Five Mountains of Korea are five renowned mountains in Korean culture.

Joseon era
Kumgang-san, Myohyang-san, and Paektu-san are under North Korean control, while Samgak-san (renamed Bukhan-san) and Jiri-san are under South Korean control.

 Center - Samgak-san (삼각산, 三角山)
 North - Paektu-san (백두산, 白頭山)
 South - Jiri-san (지리산, 智異山)
 East - Kumgang-san (금강산, 金剛山)
 West - Myohyang-san (묘향산, 妙香山)

Silla era

In Silla times, these mountains were considered as guardians of the country, so ceremonial rituals were held by these mountains. All of these mountains are within South Korea.

 Center - Palgong-san (팔공산, 八公山)
 North - Taebaek-san (태백산, 太白山)
 South - Jiri-san (지리산, 智異山)
 East - Toham-san (토함산, 吐含山)
 West - Gyeryong-san (계룡산, 鷄龍山)

North Korean list
In North Korea, the following are known as the five famous mountains. Of them, only Jiri-san is in South Korea.
 Paektu-san (백두산, 白頭山)
 Kumgang-san (금강산, 金剛山)
 Myohyang-san (묘향산, 妙香山)
 Kuwol-san (구월산, 九月山)
 Jiri-san (지리산, 智異山)

Occasionally a sixth one, Chilbo-san (칠보산, 七寶山) in North Korea, is added to reach a list of six famous mountains.

Five Peaks of Gyeonggi

These five mountains are considered as "the representative peaks of Gyeonggi-do". All of them are in South Korea, except Song'ak-san which is in North Korean territory.

 Gamak-san (감악산, 紺岳山)
 Gwanak-san (관악산, 冠岳山)
 Hwaak-san (화악산, 華岳山)
 Song'ak-san (송악산, 松岳山)
 Unak-san (운악산, 雲岳山)

See also
 Sacred Mountains of China, for five sacred mountains revered in Chinese culture
 Baekdudaegan, the mountain range that stretches down the length of the Korean peninsula

References

Mountains of Korea
Tutelary deities